The Illinois Fair Tax was a proposed amendment to the Illinois state constitution that would have effectively changed the state income tax system from a flat tax to a graduated income tax. The proposal, formally titled the "Allow for Graduated Income Tax Amendment", appeared on the ballot in the November 3, 2020 election in Illinois as a legislatively referred constitutional amendment striking language from the Constitution of Illinois requiring a flat state income tax. Concurrent with the proposed constitutional amendment, the Illinois legislature passed legislation setting a new set of graduated income tax rates that would have taken effect had the amendment been approved by voters.

Proponents argued that the proposal would make the Illinois tax code fairer, provide tax relief to most Illinoisans, better fund public goods and social services, and boost small businesses. Opponents argued it would open the door to future tax hikes, hurt businesses, drive  businesses and wealthy residents to neighboring states, and place more revenues in the hands of an untrustworthy state government.

The referendum was not approved, receiving about 45% "yes" votes and 55% "no" votes.  As a constitutional amendment, the proposal needed to be approved by 60% of those voting on the referendum, or by 50% of all voters voting in the election.

The term "Fair Tax" is used by legislative proponents and advocates of the proposed amendment, who consider a graduated income tax to be more fair than a flat tax. Opponents of the proposal refer to it using other, less favorable terms.

Context

Under current law, Illinois's state income tax rate is a flat rate of 4.95 percent. A flat income tax, which taxes all income levels at the same rate, is required by the current Illinois state constitution. Illinois is one of 11 U.S. states with a flat income tax; seven states have no income tax; 32 other states use graduated income taxes, which tax higher incomes at a higher rate. The last state to switch from a flat state income tax to a graduated state income tax was Connecticut in 1996.  The United States federal government, via the Internal Revenue Service, uses a graduated income tax.

Legislative history

2013–14: First attempts to pass graduated income tax in Illinois
In 2011, the Illinois government temporarily raised the personal income tax rate from 3% to 5% in order to raise revenues. The rate was set to drop to 3.75% in 2015. In January 2014, the non-partisan business group Civic Federation of Chicago estimated that the prescribed cut in income tax would yield decreased revenues of $1.4 billion in FY15 growing to $2.7 billion in FY16. In its own analysis, the federation projected that the loss of revenue "would dramatically destabilize Illinois' already weak financial condition." They argued that the loss of revenue would be bad for Illinois' businesses, due in part to the fact that the state still owed many private businesses money. Governor Pat Quinn proposed extending the 5 percent flat tax indefinitely, while other groups sought to use a graduated tax to raise revenues.

In 2013, State Rep. Naomi Jakobsson, an Urbana Democrat proposed and advanced HJRCA 33, the initial House legislative vehicle for the proposal. The bill received some criticism for containing no proposed tax rate schedule. The House Revenue Committee rejected Jakobsson's proposal in March 2014.

In 2014, Sen. Don Harmon (D-Oak Park) proposed a Fair Tax amendment along with separate legislation proposing a marginal rate schedule that taxed the first $12,500 of income at 2.9 percent, the range from $12,500 to $180,000 at 4.9 percent, and taxed all income over $180,000 at 6.9 percent. Harmon's proposed constitutional amendment, SJRCA 40, passed the Senate Executive Subcommittee on constitutional amendments. It advanced to the Senate Executive Committee, but failed to make the deadline to clear the Senate, and was withdrawn.

Senator Harmon's proposal was estimated to reduce the tax bill of the Illinois median taxpayer (making $55,317 per year) by $303 per year versus the 5 percent rate. Allowing 2014 law to continue would reduce the median taxpayer's bill by $689 per year, an additional savings of $386 versus the Harmon rates. Other speculative proposals had called for top marginal rates as high as 11 percent, but they were not introduced in the state legislature. Proponents argued that Harmon's rate schedule would provide tax relief to 94% of Illinoisans. Opponents and skeptics contended that was misleading since the current law in 2014 prescribed a decline in the personal income tax rate to 3.75 percent in 2015, after the expiration of a 2011 temporary surtax. They contended Harmon calculated his claimed tax relief from current rates rather than current law at the time.

2019: Passage of a graduated income tax proposal
During the 2018 Illinois gubernatorial election, Democratic candidate J. B. Pritzker campaigned in support of a Fair Tax amendment. Pritzker won the election, and Democrats controlled both chambers of the Illinois legislature. On January 28, 2019, Senator Don Harmon introduced a joint resolution that would propose a constitutional amendment allowing the Illinois government to change from a flat tax rate to a graduated rate. The resolution was approved in the Senate by a 36–22 vote on May 1 and by the House by a 73–44 vote on May 27. The resolution received two votes more than the 71 votes needed to pass in the House, in what the Chicago Tribune called a "historic vote". The passage of the resolution placed the proposed amendment on the ballot in the next general election on November 3, 2020. To pass, it requires 60% of the votes on the ballot measure itself, or a simple majority of all of those voting in the election.

Concurrently with the constitutional amendment proposals, legislators debated Senate Bill 687, which lays out the proposed new tax structure which will only go into place if voters approve Constitutional Amendment 1. If the constitutional amendment is approved, Senate Bill 687 would raise taxes on Illinois taxpayers making over $250,000. It also includes $100 million for property tax relief. This bill passed in the Senate by a 36–22 vote on May 1 and in the House by a 67–48 vote on May 30.

Proposed changes

Proposed constitutional amendment 
The amendment to be voted on in November, 2020, would replace Article IX, Section 3 of the Illinois Constitution with the following language:
Section 3. Limitations on Income Taxation

(a) The General Assembly shall provide by law for the rate
or rates of any tax on or measured by income imposed by the
State.  In any
such tax imposed upon corporations the highest rate shall not
exceed the highest rate imposed on individuals by more than a
ratio of 8 to 5.

(b) Laws imposing taxes on or measured by income may adopt
by reference provisions of the laws and regulations of the
United States, as they then exist or thereafter may be changed,
for the purpose of arriving at the amount of income upon which
the tax is imposed.

Ballot referendum language
The official ballot language of the question is as follows:The proposed amendment grants the State authority to impose higher income tax rates on higher income levels, which is how the federal government and a majority of other states do it. The amendment would remove the portion of the Revenue Article of the Illinois Constitution that is sometimes referred to as the “flat tax,” that requires all taxes on income to be at the same rate. The amendment does not itself change tax rates. It gives the State the ability to impose higher tax rates on those with higher income levels and lower tax rates on those with middle or lower income levels. You are asked to decide whether the proposed amendment should become a part of the Illinois Constitution.

Proposed rate changes
The constitutional amendment itself would remove the requirement that income be taxed at a flat rate. The state government would then be allowed to change income tax rates through the normal legislative process. The Illinois legislature proposed a new set of income tax rates in Senate Bill 687, which was enacted shortly after the constitutional amendment was approved to be placed on the ballot. This legislation would take effect on January 1, 2021, if voters approve the constitutional amendment in November 2020.

Personal income tax 
The table below shows the new tax rates on personal income proposed in Senate Bill 687. Those with a taxable income of $250,000 or less would retain the same marginal tax rate or see their rate lowered. Rates would increase for those making over $250,000, with the specific rate varying depending on whether a taxpayer is filing alone or jointly. Single filers with a taxable income over $750,000 and joint filers with a taxable income over $1 million would pay the maximum rate of 7.95% on their net income, rather than paying marginal tax rates for each tier of income.

Corporate tax and other taxes 
The proposed constitutional amendment includes a requirement that corporate tax rates must not exceed the highest income tax rate by a ratio of 8 to 5. The new tax rates proposed by the state legislature in SB 687 includes an increase in corporate income taxes from 7% to 7.99%. SB 687 would also changes the state's property tax credit, which is a credit that some residents paying property taxes can claim to reduce their income taxes, from 5% to 6%. It also creates a per-child tax credit of up to $100 for couples earning less than $100,000 and single persons earning less than $80,000. The new tax rates do not include any taxation of retirement income.

2020 statewide vote

Support and opposition
Three 501(c)(4) organizations have been formed to support the Fair Tax amendment. Vote Yes For Fairness was formed by Quentin Fulks, who is also the head of Think Big Illinois and was a staffer on Pritzker's 2018 gubernatorial campaign. Governor Pritzker donated $56.5 million of his personal wealth to Vote Yes For Fairness. Vote Yes for Fair Tax, headed by John Bouman, president of the Shriver Center on Poverty Law, and has received donations from a number of labor unions and community organizations. A third organization, Yes to a Financially Response Illinois, has been funded and organized by the AARP.

Two organizations have been formed to campaign against the Fair Tax amendment. Greg Baise, former president of the Illinois Manufacturers’ Association, formed the Vote No on Blank Check Amendment Committee to oppose the Illinois Fair Tax. A second organization opposed to the amendment, Coalition To Stop The Proposed Tax Hike Amendment, received $20 million from hedge fund manager and Illinois' wealthiest resident Kenneth C. Griffin. In October 2020, multi-Billionaire Ken Griffin donated a second time, adding $26.75 Million more to the campaign to stop the Fair Tax for a total of $46.75 million donated.

Endorsements

Arguments 
Proponents argue that a tax structure which includes lower rates for lower-income residents and higher marginal rates for higher-income residents would be fairer. They point out that when income taxes are considered alongside other state and local taxes such as sales taxes, lower-income residents pay a higher share of their income as taxes than higher-income residents. Many proponents, including the organizations formed to advocate for the passage of the proposal, have emphasized that 97% of Illinois families would not see an increase in income taxes, since the new rates passed by the legislature accompanying the ballot referendum only raise taxes for those making over $250,000.

Labor unions, activist groups, and Democratic Party politicians have pointed to estimates that the new tax rates would increase state revenues by $3.4 billion annually while reducing the burden on lower-income families, arguing that increased revenues could be used to fund schools, healthcare, and public safety. In endorsing the Fair Tax proposal, a coalition of 125 labor unions in the state argued that it would reduce economic inequality and would enable increased funding for public education and healthcare. Some proponents have also argued that the increased state revenues would help create jobs, prevent the trend of working families leaving the state, and support small businesses by giving customers more purchasing power. During the COVID-19 pandemic, the Chicago Sun-Times editorial board argued that the best way to thank essential workers and service sector workers during the pandemic would be to pass the Fair Tax, arguing that an extra dollar is more valuable to these workers than it is for the rich.

Opponents of the proposal, including several business associations, argue that it would hurt businesses in the state. The Illinois Chamber of Commerce argued the new tax system would hurt business and push wealthier earners out of the state.

Opponents have also argued that the state government cannot be trusted to appropriately spend the additional funds that would raised, and that the proposal gives lawmakers a "blank check." For example, the organization Vote No Blank Check have pointed to the corruption scandal surrounding Commonwealth Edison and Illinois House Speaker Michael Madigan in their campaign against the ballot referendum. The Illinois Policy Institute, a libertarian think tank, points to the amendment's removal of the provision that the state may only impose one tax on income and argues that legislators will be able to impose additional or special taxes on top of the regular income tax.

Polls

Election results
The proposed amendment was on the ballot during the November 3, 2020 election in Illinois as a legislatively referred constitutional amendment. In order to be approved, the measure needed to receive either 60% support among those specifically voting on the amendment or support from 50% of all ballots cast in the state's November elections.

The referendum did not pass, as it failed to meet either threshold. The "no" votes outnumbered the "yes" votes by 53.27 to 46.73%.

Notes

References

External links
 Illinois Fair Tax Calculator

Income taxes
Proposed laws of the United States
Fair Tax
2020 Illinois elections
Fair Tax
2020 ballot measures